The Pact of the Catacombs is an agreement signed by 42 bishops of the Catholic Church at a meeting following Mass in the Catacombs of Domitilla near Rome on the evening of 16 November 1965, three weeks before the close of the Second Vatican Council. They pledged to live like the poorest of their parishioners and adopt a lifestyle free of attachment to ordinary possessions. The Pact said they would "try to live according to the ordinary manner of our people in all that concerns housing, food, means of transport.... We renounce forever the appearance and the substance of wealth, especially in clothing ... and symbols made of precious metals." More than 500 bishops added their signatures in the next few months. The catacombs were chosen for their association with early Christian martyrs in the centuries when the Church was without worldly power and existed in its simplest form.

History
Laying the theological foundation for the Pact, Cardinal Giacomo Lercaro, Archbishop of Bologna, in December 1962 addressed the Council at length on the centrality of poverty. He held, according to one summary of his views, that "the question of the church of the poor ... should be the general and synthesizing subject of the whole Council." Hélder Câmara, Archbishop of Olinda e Recife, Brazil, was the moving force behind the Pact itself. Others included the Brazilians Bishop Antônio Batista Fragoso of Crateús and Bishop Jose Maria Pires of Araçuaí; Bishop Manuel Larraín Errázuriz of Talca, Chile; Archbishop Tulio Botero of Medellín, Colombia; Bishop Marcos Gregorio McGrath of Santiago de Veraguas, Panama; and Bishop Leonidas Proaño of Riobamba, Ecuador. Bishop Charles-Marie Himmer (1902-1994) of Tournai, Belgium, presided at the Mass. The only North American among the first to sign was Bishop Gerard-Marie Coderre of Saint-Jean-de-Quebec.

Luigi Bettazzi, who was Auxiliary Bishop of Bologna under Lercaro when he signed and who became the last survivor of the original signors, said a few bishops created the document and then plans for a signing ceremony "spread by word of mouth". He felt the document was forgotten because Pope Paul VI, given the Cold War environment of his papacy, preferred not to be associated with its implicit criticism of capitalism. He has also cited the impact of the upheavals of 1968, which "frightened everyone and everything closed down". Thus it failed to put poverty at the center of the Church's mission, except in Latin America where it became associated with liberation theology. The document itself has been lost (but re-produced in Latin American Theology: Roots and Branches
by Maria Clara Bingemer - see reference below), but as the fiftieth anniversary of its signing approached, the Pact gained increasing notice due to the efforts of theologians and historians, especially in Germany, to draw attention to its significance. The Pontifical Urban University held a conference on its legacy in November 2015. According to Bettazzi, "The Pact of the Catacombs today is ... Pope Francis". Cardinal Walter Kasper, who mentioned the pact in his book Mercy (2014), has said of Pope Francis that "His program is to a high degree what the Catacomb Pact was". Francis met with Bettazzi in September 2017 before addressing priests, religious, seminarians and deacons in Bologna, where he began his speech with words reminiscent of the Pact: "It is a consolation to be with those who carry on the apostolate of the Church; religious men seeking to bear witness against worldliness."

See also
 Bologna School (history)
 St. Gallen Group

References

Sources
 Text of the "Pact of the Catacombs", also here
 

Catholic theology and doctrine
Christian theological movements
Marxism
Religion and politics
Liberation theology
Catholic social teaching
Christian radicalism